NGC 6158 is an elliptical galaxy located about 400 million light-years away in the constellation Hercules. The galaxy was discovered by astronomer William Herschel on March 17, 1787 and is a member of Abell 2199.

See also
 List of NGC objects (6001–7000)
 NGC 6166, A giant elliptical galaxy in the center of Abell 2199

References

External links

6158
58198
Hercules (constellation)
Abell 2199
Astronomical objects discovered in 1787
Elliptical galaxies